{{DISPLAYTITLE:C16H12Cl2N2O}}
The molecular formula C16H12Cl2N2O may refer to:

 Cloroqualone
 Diclazepam (Ro5-3448)
 Ro5-4864, or 4'-chlorodiazepam
 SL-164

Molecular formulas